The Eccles Line is a tram line of the Manchester Metrolink in Greater Manchester running from Manchester to Eccles via Salford Quays, with a short spur to MediaCityUK. It was opened in phases during 1999–2000 as part of the second phase of the system's development. The spur to MediaCityUK was opened in 2010. The line contains a mixture of reserved track beds and a street running section.

Route

The line physically starts at a junction with the Altrincham Line, just west of Cornbrook tram stop, which itself was opened with the line, initially as an interchange between the Eccles and Altrincham lines. It then runs over the 650-metre-long Pomona Viaduct, which carries the line over both the Bridgewater Canal and the Manchester Ship Canal: Pomona tram stop is located upon this viaduct south of the ship canal, and is the interchange with the Trafford Park Line which opened in Spring 2020. The line then weaves through the Salford Quays area on a reserved trackbed, which is segregated from other traffic (except pedestrians in some places).

Route map

History
During the 1990s, Salford Quays became a business district specifically redeveloped for commerce, leisure, culture and tourism with a high density of business units and modern housing, complemented by a cinema complex, office blocks, and waterfront promenade. As it had poor public transport integration and no rail provision, it was earmarked for a potential Metrolink line as early as 1986 and legal authority to construct the line through the Quays was acquired in 1990. The Quays received millions of pounds of investment and a public consultation and public inquiry resulted in government endorsement in 1994. In autumn 1995 a  Metrolink line branching from Cornbrook tram stop to Eccles via Salford Quays capitalising on the regenerated Quayside was confirmed as Phase 2 of Metrolink. No funding came from central government and money was raised from the Greater Manchester Passenger Transport Authority (GMPTA), the European Regional Development Fund and private developers. In April 1997 Altram, a consortium of the Serco, Ansaldo and John Laing, was appointed to construct the Eccles Line; Serco, responsible for the Sheffield Supertram would operate the whole network under contract; Ansaldo provided six additional vehicles — T-68As – and signalling equipment. Construction work officially began on 17 July 1997.

The Eccles Line was officially opened as far as Broadway tram stop on 6 December 1999 by the Prime Minister, Tony Blair, who praised Metrolink as "exactly the type of scheme needed to solve the transport problems of the metropolitan areas of the country"; a service to Eccles Interchange joined the network on 21 July 2000, and was officially declared open by Anne, Princess Royal at a ceremony on 9 January 2001.

The specially-constructed 360-metre (0.22 mi) long spur to MediaCityUK tram stop was opened on 20 September 2010, to serve the MediaCityUK development. The Eccles Line underwent essential track renewal over a two-month period in 2016.

Services
As of 2016, there are two services running on the Eccles Line: 

A 12-minute interval service from Eccles to  running all hours, during evenings and Sundays this service runs via MediaCityUK.

Rolling stock

To commence operations in 1999, six T-68A trams were ordered to operate the line. These were variants of the original T-68 trams which had operated the original system from 1992, which had modifications to allow them to operate on the street running section of the Eccles line with other motor traffic. All of the T-68 fleet was eventually modified to allow them to operate on the Eccles line.

From 2009 the new fleet of M5000 trams were introduced, and these replaced the T-68/A trams during 2012–14.

References

Bibliography

External links

 LRTA entry on this line
 Entry on this line from thetrams.co.uk

Manchester Metrolink lines
Railway lines opened in 1999
1999 establishments in England